The House of Light (lit. "The White Room") is a Canadian drama film, directed by Jean Pierre Lefebvre and released in 1969. The film stars Marcel Sabourin and Michèle Magny as a husband and wife who are interacting entirely in their bedroom, engaging in conversations about their relationship while the scenery outside their bedroom window provides the only major visual change in setting.

The film premiered in July 1969. It was subsequently screened in the Directors' Fortnight program at the 1970 Cannes Film Festival.

The film was included in Jean Pierre Lefebvre: Vidéaste, a retrospective program of Lefebvre's films at the 2001 Toronto International Film Festival.

References

External links

1969 films
Canadian drama films
1969 drama films
Films directed by Jean Pierre Lefebvre
Films shot in Montreal
French-language Canadian films
1960s Canadian films